Events from the year 1813 in Ireland.

Events
26 July – Battle of Garvagh, County Londonderry: Four hundred Catholic Ribbonmen attempt to destroy a tavern in Garvagh where the Orange Lodge meet and are repelled by Protestants with muskets. This was commemorated in the song "The Battle of Garvagh".
10 September – the largest meteorite ever to fall on the British Isles lands at Adare, County Limerick. Now held in the Limerick Museum

Arts and literature
"Poetical Attempts by Hugh Porter, a County of Down weaver" published in Belfast.
The Patron, or The Festival of Saint Kevin at the Seven Churches, Glendalough painted by Joseph Peacock.

Births
6 January – Charles Lanyon, architect (born in England; died 1889).
3 February – Thomas Mellon, entrepreneur, lawyer, and judge founder of Mellon Bank (died 1908).
2 June – Daniel Pollen, politician, ninth Premier of New Zealand (died 1876).
7 June – Sir Thomas Burke, 3rd Baronet, landowner and politician (died 1875).
6 September – Isaac Butt, Irish Conservative Party MP and founder of the Home Rule League (died 1879).
10 November – Patrick Duggan, Roman Catholic Bishop of Clonfert (died 1896).
14 November – Benjamin Lett, bomber and arsonist in America and Canada (died 1858).
19 December – Thomas Andrews, chemist and physicist (died 1885).
Undated
Margaret Haughery, baker and philanthropist in New Orleans (died 1882).
John Skipton Mulvany, architect (died 1870).

Deaths
28 May – Edmund Garvey, painter (born 1740).
18 August – Friedrich Bridgetower, composer and cellist, brother of George Bridgetower, in Newry.
Autumn – Henrietta Battier, poet, satirist and actress (born c. 1751).

References

 
Years of the 19th century in Ireland
1810s in Ireland
Ireland
 Ireland